Gumville is an unincorporated community in Berkeley County, South Carolina, United States.  It is located approximately 2 miles west of Jamestown on U.S. Route 17 Alternate.  Gumville was made famous as the birthplace of L. Mendel Rivers, the longtime Representative of the 1st congressional district.  When queried about where he was born by reporters, Rivers would reply "I'm from Gumville.  It's near Hell Hole Swamp.  If you don't know where it is, look it up."

Gumville is part of the Charleston–North Charleston–Summerville Metropolitan Statistical Area.

Geography
Gumville is located at  (33.281111, -79.727778).

A road named Gumville Road runs from Gumville, at the intersection with US 17A, south for three miles to the junction with Calestown Road.

References

Further reading
 
 

Unincorporated communities in Berkeley County, South Carolina
Unincorporated communities in South Carolina
Charleston–North Charleston–Summerville metropolitan area